The Finals (stylized as THE FINALS) is an upcoming first-person shooter, developed and published by Nexon subsidiary Embark Studios. The game focuses on team-based matches on environmentally-destructive maps, where players are encouraged to use the dynamic environment to their advantage. It is in closed beta from March 7 to March 21.

Gameplay 
The Finals revolves around people competing in a televised virtual combat gameshow. This is reflected in the holographic crowds which are seen during gameplay, as well as the commentary provided by the game in the form of various hosts making observations about the status of a given team or the game itself. Developer Embark Studios have stated that the game is partly inspired by The Hunger Games and Gladiator (2000).

In the base mode (referred to as "Cashout"), the players form teams of three, which compete to complete objectives, consisting of opening vaults and transporting them to a "cash-out" location. Aspects of these objectives take inspiration from capture the flag, requiring teams to have a control of the area to perform the desired action. The ultimate winner of the round is the team which has collected the most money as determined by the cash-out value and other metrics such as points, eliminations, assists, deaths, revives, and objectives. These metrics are also shown to the player and their team once the match has ended. The players earn in-game currency by eliminating players, completing objectives, and other combat maneuvers. 

The players choose their characters based on a "Light", "Medium", "Heavy" scale, with the character model changing to reflect that. Certain weapons, moves, and features are class specific and each class has a different movement speed. Light builds are faster and smaller and may use submachine guns and invisibility, Medium builds may use a healing beam and access to assault rifles and shotguns, while the Heavy build is designed to tank hits with the abilities that make the use of it, with choice of light machine guns and C4 as their equipment.

The weapons and equipment specified are not locked in for the class. For example, the Heavy build may choose to use sledgehammer, while the Light build may opt to use a knife. Medium builds also have the choice of healing beam (which is similar to that of Mercy in Overwatch), or defibrillator, the latter of which enables near instant revival of a team member who has been killed. This is not a comprehensive accounting of all options for all classes, and neglects other equipment which can impact things like mobility, such as the grappling hook available to the Medium build, as well as the presence of zip lines, which must be placed by someone who has that as a character trait, but can be used by anybody. 

The game mechanics encourage emergent gameplay by the way of the many free variables present. These include the highly player modifiable terrain (both destruction and limited construction), varied weather conditions and time of day (which change between matches), and team compositions. The arenas contain items which are suspended from ropes, as well as items on the ground that can be picked up and thrown by the players, such as barrels and plant pots. Some of them are explosive, meaning they will explode on impact. Entire buildings are potentially destructible if the correct supports are targeted. The game does allow for limited construction, though this takes the form of temporary structures (such as barriers the player can shelter behind), as well as through use of the "Goo gun" and "Goo grenade", which both create a solid, though destructable barrier, which has the appearance of foam insulation.

Players who are killed are turned into statues which their teammates can use to revive them. If the reviving teammate has a defibrillator the process is nearly instant, otherwise it takes approximately five seconds. If enough time elapses, a player may choose to respawn themselves, though this consumes a so-called "Respawn Coin". Players have limited respawn coins.

Reception 
On release of the beta Twitch streamers, including AquaFPS, discovered some minor issues with the game's handling of friction, which caused players to sometimes feel as if their character was "ice skating", as well as a quiet, but clearly present, static which played while the player is in "Spectator" mode (following in-game death). Poor performance and low frame rate has also been a highly discussed issue.

References

External links 
 Official website

Upcoming video games
Cooperative video games
First-person shooter multiplayer online games
Multiplayer video games
Windows-only games
Free-to-play video games
Video games developed in Sweden